Luthfi Assyaukanie (August 27, 1967), is a cofounder of the Liberal Islam Network (Jaringan Islam Liberal, JIL) in Indonesia, a lecturer at Paramadina University, and a research associate at the Freedom Institute.

Biography
Born in Jakarta, Indonesia, Assyaukanie received his early education in religious institutions. He later continued his study at the University of Jordan specializing in Islamic Law and Philosophy. He obtained his Master's degree from the International Islamic University in Malaysia, and received his Ph.D degree in Islamic Studies from the University of Melbourne, Australia.

Before studying in Australia, Assyaukanie worked at Ummat magazine, an Islamic weekly magazine, as an editor. In 2001, together with Ulil Abshar Abdalla, he founded the Liberal Islam Network. While teaching at Paramadina University, he also works at the Freedom Institute in Jakarta.

Publications
Assyaukanie has published two books and has written hundreds of articles mostly in Indonesian. His articles appeared in national magazines and newspapers, including Tempo, Kompas, Media Indonesia, and Jawa Pos. He contributed approximately fifty entries in two Indonesian encyclopaedias published by Ichtiar Baru van Hoeve (Jakarta): Ensiklopedi Tematis Dunia Islam (Thematical Encyclopaedia of Islamic World). 7 vols., 2002; Ensiklopedi Islam Untuk Pelajar (Islamic Encyclopedia for Students). 6 vols., 2001.

Books

 Freedom, the State, and Development: Arief Budiman's Essays (Editor and Foreword). Jakarta: Pustaka Alvabet, 2006. Details
 Faces of Liberal Islam in Indonesia (Editor and Foreword). Jakarta: Jaringan Islam Liberal: Teater Utan Kayu, 2002. Details
 Politics, Human Rights, and The Issues of Technology in Contemporary Islamic Law. Bandung: Pustaka Hidayah, 1998. Details

Journal articles

 "Democracy and the Islamic State: Muslim Arguments for Political Change in Indonesia". Vol 20 (2004). The Copenhagen Journal of Asian Studies.
 "Bringing Fiqh Back to Urban Areas: Making Sense of Professor Sahal Mahfudh's Idea of Social Fiqh". ICIP E-Journal, Volume 1, Number

Education

 2006 Ph.D. in Islamic Studies, the University of Melbourne, Australia
 2003 M.A. in Islamic Studies (leading to Phd), the University of Melbourne, Australia
 1995 M.A. in Philosophy, International Islamic University, Malaysia
 1993 B.A. in Islamic Law (Major), the University of Jordan, Jordan
 1993 B.A. in Philosophy (Minor), the University of Jordan, Jordan

Awards

  2002–2005 Australian Development Scholarship, Australia
 2004 the Melbourne Abroad Travelling Scholarship, Australia
 1993–1995 the Institute of Islamic Thought and Civilization Scholarship, Malaysia
 1988–1993 Ministry of Education Scholarship, Jordan
 1987–1988 Ministry of Awqaf and Islamic Affairs Scholarship, Jordan

External links
 Profile at JIL website

1967 births
Living people
People from Jakarta
Indonesian writers
Indonesian Muslims
21st-century Muslim scholars of Islam
Islamic philosophers
University of Jordan alumni